Ollerup is a town located on the island of Funen in south-central Denmark, in Svendborg Municipality.

Notable people 
 Nanna Kristensen-Randers (1864–1908) a Danish lawyer and folk high school administrator; from 1894 she assisted in running Ollerup Højskole
 Niels Bukh (1880–1950) a Danish gymnast and educator who founded the first athletic folk high school in Ollerup
 Ejnar Mindedal Rasmussen (1892 in Ollerup – 1975 in Ollerup) a Danish Neoclassical architect
 Count Eigil Knuth (1903–1996) a Danish explorer, archaeologist, sculptor and writer; in 1932, he graduated as a gymnastics teacher from Ollerup Physical Training College 
 Mogens Møller (1934–2021) a Danish minimalist painter and sculptor, from 2004 to 2007, he helped carry out comprehensive decoration work at the Ollerup School of Gymnastics

References 

Cities and towns in the Region of Southern Denmark
Svendborg Municipality